The Argentina–Mexico football rivalry is a sports rivalry that exists between the national football teams of the two countries. Although the rivalry is not a very competitive one with Argentina holding 16 victories, 12 draws and only 4 loses in 31 meetings, the game draws a lot of attention from the media in Mexico. In fact, this rivalry is more keenly felt by Mexican supporters than Argentines, with the latter viewing Brazil, Uruguay, England, and Germany as bigger rivals. A number of Argentines do not consider Mexico as rivals. Argentina has not lost to Mexico since 2004, with the last 4 meetings being shutout victories. Mexico has not scored against Argentina since 2015 in a friendly.

The rivalry is unusual in that it is an intercontinental one; typically such footballing rivalries exist between countries that are close to one another, for example France–Italy or Argentina–Brazil.

History 
Although the first official match between both nations came in the 1930 FIFA World Cup where Argentina beat Mexico 6–3 on group stage, the rivalry emerged during the late twentieth century, especially after the 1993 Copa América Final, where Argentina beat Mexico 2–1. That was the first time a non-CONMEBOL nation played in a Copa América final, and the first final played between both sides.

Managed by Alfio Basile, Argentina won the Copa América for the fourteenth time, defending their title won two years before. Argentina would not win another Copa America until 2021.

Overall, Argentina hold the edge in the rivalry in official matches, with sixteen victories, four by Mexico, and twelve draws.

Beyond the rivalry between both teams, many Argentine coaches have served as managers of Mexican teams. While César Menotti is widely recognised for his work with the Mexico national team, Nevertheless, other Argentine that managed Mexico in subsecquent years (such as Ricardo LaVolpe or more recently Gerardo Martino) were heavily criticized by the local media despite some good results leading the team. Former Mexican player and manager Hugo Sánchez has always been reluctant with the idea of having foreign managers.

During the 2022 FIFA World Cup held in Qatar, some Mexican and Argentine fans had a fight in Doha prior to the match between both sides. Both supporters fought again inside Lusail Stadium after the match that Argentina won 2–0. Previously, Mexican fans had been singing a song that include political and social references to the Malvinas Islands War with a phrase ("in the Malvinas, English language is spoken") that provoqued Argentine fans' wrath towards them.

List of matches 
The chart includes the complete list of matches played between both teams:

Notes

Statistics 
(Only official matches are included):

Club competition 

At club level, Argentine and Mexican teams met for the first time at Copa Interamericana, a defunct competition contested by Conmebol and Concacaf club champions. In the first edition of the tournament (1968), Estudiantes de La Plata beat Toluca after a two-legged and a playoff series, winning the first trophy for South America.

The first Mexican win over an Argentine side in Copa Interamericana came in 1977 when Club América defeated Boca Juniors. After both teams won one match each, a playoff was held in Mexico City, where América won 2–1 to achieve their first title.

The rivalry between both nations at club level increased during the late 1990s, when Mexican clubs were invited to participate in Copa Libertadores. After Mexican representatives were eliminated on round of 16 in 1998, in the 2000 edition América lost to Boca Juniors in semifinals (5–4 on aggregate). The progress of Mexican sides in the competition was clearly evident in 2001 when Cruz Azul became the first Mexican team to play a final, being defeated by Boca Juniors on penalties after winning one game each (as visitor teams). Previously, Cruz Azul had eliminated Cerro Porteño (round of 16) and two Argentine teams, River Plate and Rosario Central (in quarter and semifinals respectively).

The most controversial game between Mexican and Argentine teams in club competitions occurred in 2005, when Guadalajara faced Boca Juniors in quarter finals. In the first leg, Guadalajara beat Boca Juniors 4–0, being considered one of the greatest achievements of Mexican teams over Argentine rivals. In the second leg at La Bombonera, Chivas player Adolfo Bautista mock Boca Juniors supporters which caused Martín Palermo beat him. As a result, both were sent off while Boca Juniors coach, Jorge Benítez, spit at Bautista's face. The final 0–0 score eliminated Boca Juniors from the competition and the match passed into history as an embarrassing scandal. Benítez's misconduct caused Boca Juniors fired him after the incident.

Tigres UANL became the second Mexican team to play a Copa Libertadores final in 2015, but they lost to River Plate (0–3 on aggregate). After the 2017 edition, Mexican teams would decline to participate in Copa Libertadores due to scheduling problems.

See also 
 Argentina–Mexico relations

References

Argentina–Mexico relations
Argentina national football team rivalries
International association football rivalries